Bainville-aux-Saules is a commune in the Vosges department in Grand Est in northeastern France.

Geography
The river Madon flows through the commune.

Notable Residents
François Perrin (1754-1830), violin maker

See also
Communes of the Vosges department

References

Communes of Vosges (department)